Matthew Welch (born 1976) is an American bagpiper and composer.

Welch took a bachelor's in music at Simon Fraser University in Canada and then enrolled at Wesleyan University, where he studied under Anthony Braxton and Alvin Lucier. He has released several CD albums and composed pieces both for bagpipe and for more traditional ensembles, exploring elements of free jazz and experimental music.

Discography
 Ceol Nua (Leo, 2002)
 Hag at the Churn (Newsonic, 2003)
 Dream Tigers (Tzadik, 2005)
 Luminosity (Porter, 2009)
 Blarvuster (Tzadik, 2010)

References

21st-century American composers
Simon Fraser University alumni
1976 births
Living people
Leo Records artists